The Black Sea is an inland sea between southeastern Europe and Asia Minor.

Black Sea may also refer to:

Places
 Black Sea (China), another name for Lake Heihai, a small lake in Qinghai, China
 Black Sea (region), a coastal area of Turkey
 Ann Street, Boston, US, colloquially known as Black Sea

Entertainment
 Black Sea (XTC album), 1980
 Black Sea (Fennesz album), 2008
 Black Sea Studios, a Bulgarian video game developer
 Black Sea (book), a travel/history book by Neal Ascherson
 Black Sea (film), a 2014 British submarine film starring Jude Law
 "The Black Sea", a 1996 song by Orchestral Manoeuvres in the Dark from the album Universal
 "The Black Sea", a song from We Stood Like Kings' album USSR 1926 (2015), a soundtrack for the silent movie A Sixth Part of the World

Other uses
 Black Sea, a call sign of Turkish MNG Airlines
 Battle of Mogadishu (1993), also known as the Battle of the Black sea

 Black Sea drainage basin
 History of Black Sea
 Black Sea climate and ecology
 Black Sea trade and economy